Saint-Jean (Languedocien: Sent Joan le Vièlh) is a commune in the Haute-Garonne department in southwestern France.

It is located northeast of Toulouse on the N88 or road of Albi (exit 14 on the peripheral).

Population

The inhabitants of the commune are known as Saint-Jeannais.

Sights
One of the commune's main points of interest is its historic church.

Monument

International relations

Saint-Jean is twinned with:
 Fontanafredda, Italy

See also
Communes of the Haute-Garonne department

References

External links 

 Official site

Communes of Haute-Garonne